The Milwaukee Courier is a weekly African-American newspaper based in Milwaukee, Wisconsin. It was founded in 1964 and is the state's oldest black-owned newspaper. The newspaper is owned by Courier Communications, which also owns and operates the radio station WNOV, and The Madison Times which they acquired in 2014.

The paper's owner Jerrel Jones, who sits on the board of the Potawatomi Foundation, launched and funded a successful recall petition against then-Senator Gary George in 2003, over his opposition to a bill supporting the Potawatomi Hotel & Casino. The newspaper was also known for having a 102-year-old writer, Mattiebelle Woods, who wrote a social column for the newspaper.

References

External links
 Official Website

African-American newspapers
Publications established in 1964
Newspapers
African-American